Necdet Uğur (full name Mustafa Necdet Uğur) (1 January 1923 – 27 September 2004) was a politician in Turkey

Early life and education
He was born in 1923 in Mecitözü ilçe (district) of Çorum Province. In 1944 he graduated from the Faculty of Political Science, of Ankara University. He served as chief security director of several Turkish Provinces including İstanbul and İzmir. Before the 1963 Turkish local elections he was appointed as the İstanbul mayor to serve up to the election date. However he did not run for the office in the elections.

Political life
After 1968 he attended politics in Republican People's Party (CHP) and became the speaker of the İstanbul branch of his party. On 11 October 1969 by the 1969 Turkish general election, he was elected to the lower house. He was also elected in 1973 and 1977 elections. In the short-lived 40th government of Turkey he was the Minister of Interior (1977). In the 42nd government of Turkey he was the Minister of National Education (1978-1979). After 1980 Turkish coup d'état like all senior politicians he abandoned politics . But in 1987 he became a member of Social Democrat Populist Party (SHP).

Books
He wrote two books; İsmet İnönü and Alla Turca'nın Sonu. First book is on İsmet İnönü the former speaker of CHP and one of the friends of Atatürk, the founder of Turkish Republic. The second book is on criticism of the inadequacy of Turkish policy in the information age

Death
He died on 27 September 2004 in İstanbul.

References

External links

1923 births
2004 deaths
People from Mecitözü
Ankara University Faculty of Political Sciences alumni
Members of the 40th government of Turkey
Members of the 42nd government of Turkey
Republican People's Party (Turkey) politicians
Social Democratic Populist Party (Turkey) politicians
Ministers of National Education of Turkey
Mayors of Istanbul